Route 6 is a national route of Uruguay. In 1981, it was assigned the name Joaquín Suárez. It connects Montevideo with the northeast of Rivera Department, at Vichadero, with an extension reaching the border with Brazil. The road is approximately 428 kilometres long till Vichadero.

The distance notation along Route 6 uses the same Kilometre Zero reference as Routes 1, 3, 5, 7, 8, 9 and IB, which is the Pillar of Peace of Plaza de Cagancha in the Centro of Montevideo.

The only cities apart from Montevideo it connects with are San Ramón in Canelones Department and Sarandí del Yí in Durazno Department. North of Canelones, Route 6 passes mostly through sparsely populated areas and connects with few small towns and villages.

South end
Its extension in Montevideo is Avenida de las Instrucciones, which splits into Route 33 and Route 6 in Toledo Chico, just before the border with Canelones Department.

Destinations and junctions

These are the populated places Route 6 passes through, as well as its main junctions with other National Roads.
Montevideo Department
 Km. 18 Avenida de las Instrucciones turns into Route 6. At this point, Route 7 merges with it and both go northeast.
 Km. 21 Route 33 north to Routes 11 & 65.
Canelones Department
 Km. 22 Toledo
 Km. 27 Route 6 splits from Route 7, turning north.
 Km. 32/33 Route 107 northwest to Sauce and Canelones, while Route 6 passes east of Sauce.
 Km. 35 Route 86 northeast to Route 11.
 Km. 50 Route 11 west to Canelones, southeast to Atlántida. 
 Km. 51 Santa Rosa
 Km. 60 San Bautista, Route 81 east to Migues.
 Km. 70 Castellanos, Route 65 west and south to San Antonio and to Route 11, east to Route 7.
 Km. 79 San Ramón, Route 12 east to Tala, Route 63 southwest to Santa Lucía.
Florida Department
 Km. 87 Chamizo, Route 94 east to Fray Marcos.
 Km. 111 Route 56 west to Florida, east to Route 7.
 Km. 180 Capilla del Sauce
Durazno Department
 Km. 200 Sarandí del Yí, Route 14 west to Durazno, Trinidad & Mercedes, southeast to Lascano & La Coronilla. 
 Km. 235 Route 43 northwest to San Gregorio de Polanco and to Routes 59 & 5.
Cerro Largo Department
 It crosses a distance of only  in this department from the stream Arroyo de Cordobés at Paso del Gordo to the Río Negro at Paso Pereira, where it passes over the river on a hand pulled wire cable ferry with single car capacity.  before the ferry, it meets with Route 38 which connects it with Route 7 near Tupambaé.
Tacuarembó
 Km. 360 Route 26 northwest to Tacuarembó, east-southeast to Melo & Río Branco.
 Km. 399 Route 44 (border with Rivera) northwest to Ansina, southeast to Melo. 
Rivera Department
 Km. 427/428 Vichadero & Route 27 northwest to Rivera, while also connecting to Minas de Corrales via Routes 29 & 28.
 A smaller road extends north to Paso Hospital (Km. 445) and the Brazilian border (Km. 465).

References

Roads in Uruguay